Telecommunications in Slovakia includes fixed and mobile telephones, radio, television, and the Internet.

Telephone

Fixed lines
Slovak Telecom Inc. (former Slovenské Telekomunikácie, a.s.) was privatised on 18 July 2000. The 51% package of shares was purchased by the German Deutsche Telecom AG for 1 bln. EUR (more than 44 bln. SKK at that time). The outstanding 49% of the shares are still owned by the Slovak government through the Department of Transport, Construction and Regional Development of the Slovak Republic (34%) and the National Property Fund (15%).  Slovak Telecom was rebranded to T-Com in the year 2003. In 2010 there were more than 100 companies licensed to provide public fixed line telephone service, although many of these do not offer commercial service to the wider public. The most notable country-wide providers are T-Com, Orange, Dial Telecom, SWAN and UPC. Several regional providers also operate in the market. Many of these offer triple-play services consisting of a fixed line service, broadband internet access and access to television programmes. The number of triple-play customers has doubled since the service was introduced and currently peaks at 78,049 subscribers.

Due to strong penetration of the Slovak market by mobile phones, the fixed lines sector has decreased dramatically in recent years. While there were 1,655,380 fixed lines in use in 1999, their number decreased by 60% to 994,421 in 2010.

Key figures of the fixed lines sector

Fixed lines: 1.1 million lines, 75th in the world (2011).
Density: 18.31 lines per 100 inhabitants (2010).
Lines connected to digital exchanges: 100% (2010).
Households with fixed lines: 39.0% (2010).

Mobile cellular
Mobile communication in Slovakia first became available in the early 1990s when the first NMT network operator, EuroTel Bratislava, a.s., a subsidiary of the then state owned Slovenské Telekomunikácie a.s. EuroTel, introduced the first GSM service to public in 1997. EuroTel was privatised together with its parent company and was rebranded as T-Mobile on 3 May 2005. It is now fully integrated as part of the international T-Mobile brand. The second GSM network operator started its operation on 15 January 1997 under the name GlobTel a.s. It was acquired by France Télécom (through Atlas Services Belgium, 100% shares) and rebranded to Orange Slovensko on 27 March 2002. Telefónica Europe, the third mobile operator in Slovakia, entered the market in February 2007 under the O2 brand.

Virtual providers are active in the Slovak market, the most notable being Tesco Mobile (associated with Tesco Stores) and FunFón (a virtual operator associated with a popular FM radio station).

Key figures of the mobile cellular sector

 Active mobile cellular: 6.0 million subscribers, 99th in the world (2011).
 Density: 105.12 subscriptions per 100 inhabitants (2010).
 Land coverage of land (GSM): 95.9% of the land area (2010).
 Population coverage (GSM): 99.6% of the population (2010).

Telephone system
 International country code: +421, three international exchanges, one in Bratislava and two in Banská Bystrica.
 Emergency call numbers:
 112 - EU standard integrated emergency service (one nationwide call centre directly connected to police, EMS, firefighters, Mountain Rescue Service and others)
 158 - direct call centre - Police
 155 - direct call centre - EMS (features doctors available for consultations online)
 150 - direct call centre - Firefighters
 18300 - direct call centre - Mountain Rescue Service

Radio
 Radio and Television of Slovakia (RTVS), the state-owned public broadcaster, operates multiple national and regional radio networks (2008).
 Privately owned radio stations: more than 20 (2008).
 Radios: 3.12 million (1997).
 List of most-listened-to radio stations as of June 2012:
 Rádio Expres - 19.5% listened-to yesterday
 Rádio Slovensko - 17.0% listened-to yesterday
 Fun Rádio - 12.3% listened-to yesterday
 Jemné Melódie - 8.2% listened-to yesterday
 Rádio Europa 2 - 7.7% listened-to yesterday
 Rádio Regina - 6.3% listened-to yesterday
 Rádio Viva - 5.4% listened-to yesterday

Television

 Radio and Television of Slovakia (RTVS), the state-owned public broadcaster, operates 3 national TV stations (2008).
 Privately owned TV stations: 35 operating nationally, regionally, and locally (2008).
 Cable or satellite TV: ~ 40% of households are connected to multi-channel cable or satellite TV (2008).
 Televisions: 2.62 million (1997).

Internet

Slovakia has one of the highest Internet penetration rates in the world and the highest penetration rate in Central and Eastern Europe. Slovakia has a large number of full-area ISP's that offer wired broadband Internet connections, including Slovak Telekom, Orange Slovensko and UPC. They offer a range of connections, from ADSL / ADSL2+ to fiber optic. ADSL or ADSL2+, VDSL is available in almost every town and village in Slovakia.

Key figures of the Internet sector
 Internet country code (TLD): .sk
 Internet users: ~ 80% of the population, ~ 4.4 million (2012).
 Internet hosts: 1.4 million, 41st in the world (2012).

Internet censorship and surveillance
There are no government restrictions on access to the Internet or reports that the government monitors e-mail or Internet chat rooms without judicial oversight; however, police monitor Web sites containing hate speech and attempt to arrest or fine the authors.

The constitution and the law provide for freedom of speech and press. While the government mostly respects these rights in practice, in some instances, it limits these rights to impede criticism and limit actions of groups it considers extremist. The law prohibits the defamation of nationalities, punishable by up to three years in prison, and denial of the Holocaust, which carries a sentence of six months to three years in prison. Criminal penalties for defamation are rarely used. The constitution and the law prohibit arbitrary interference with privacy, family, home, or correspondence and the government generally respects these prohibitions in practice. Police must present a warrant before conducting a search or within 24 hours afterwards.

A new draft law under consideration in 2011 would allow the nation's tax office to block web servers that provide online gambling without a Slovak license. Opponents argue that the economic interests served by the law are not sufficient to justify online censorship.

See also

 Telephone numbers in Slovakia
 Piano Media, a subscription-based payment system enabling paid content and services on Slovak media websites.

Notes

References

External links
 Department of Transport, Construction and Regional Development of the Slovak Republic
 Telecommunications Regulatory Authority of the Slovak Republic
 SK-NIC, Slovak TLD registry 
 Slovak Internet Exchange (SIX) 

 
Slovakia
Slovakia